The Korea Basic Science Institute (KBSI) is a Korean government-funded research institute that conducts basic science research and relevant pure basic research. KBSI was established in August 1988 as a research institute under the National Research Council of Science and Technology of Korea. Headquarters are located in Daejeon and Cheongju while nine regional centers are located in eight domestic cities.

References

External links
  (English and Korean)

Research institutes established in 1988
1988 establishments in South Korea
Research institutes in South Korea
Daejeon